The Linden Apartments are a historic multiunit apartment house at 10–12 Linden Pl. in Stamford, Connecticut. It is a -story wood-frame Second Empire style building with a mansard roof, and projecting window bays.  Built in 1886, it is the most architecturally distinctive tenement house in the city, and is its oldest surviving six-unit building.  It was probably built by George Hoyt, one Stamford's leading 19th-century real estate developers.

The building was listed on the National Register of Historic Places in 1983.

See also
National Register of Historic Places listings in Stamford, Connecticut

References

National Register of Historic Places in Fairfield County, Connecticut
Second Empire architecture in Connecticut
Residential buildings completed in 1886
Buildings and structures in Stamford, Connecticut